Kathleen Murphy is the name of:

Kathleen Murphy (executive), American investment banker, lawyer, and executive
Kathleen Murphy (politician), American state representative from Virginia
Kathleen Murphy (martial artist) (born 1979), martial artist
Kathleen M. Murphy (died 1963), poet

See also
Catherine Murphy (disambiguation)